Fort Lincoln may refer to:
Fort Abraham Lincoln, an old military post near Mandan, North Dakota, now a state park
Fort Lincoln Internment Camp, former military post and internment camp near Bismarck
Fort Lincoln (Kansas)
Fort Lincoln (Texas), former federal frontier defense post in Texas
Fort Lincoln (Washington, D.C.), a neighborhood of Northeast Washington, D.C.
Fort Lincoln (District of Columbia), a Civil War fort in Northeast Washington, D.C.